Cheng Xiaoyan (born December 20, 1975) is a retired Chinese shot putter. She is from Qingdao.

Her personal best throw is 20.02 metres, achieved in June 1994 in Beijing.

Achievements

References

1975 births
Living people
Athletes (track and field) at the 1998 Asian Games
Athletes (track and field) at the 2000 Summer Olympics
Chinese female shot putters
Olympic athletes of China
Asian Games medalists in athletics (track and field)
Universiade medalists in athletics (track and field)
Asian Games silver medalists for China
Medalists at the 1998 Asian Games
Universiade silver medalists for China
Medalists at the 1995 Summer Universiade
Competitors at the 2001 Summer Universiade
20th-century Chinese women
21st-century Chinese women